Nik-related protein kinase is an enzyme that, in humans, is encoded by the NRK gene.

References

Further reading